Claire Wolniewicz (born 1966) is a French journalist and writer, of Polish origin. She studied law and worked for a while in the field of intellectual property. She works as a freelance journalist, and has written TV scripts, short stories and novels. Her debut novel Ubiquité won the 2006 Prix des Lycéens Librecourt.

Selected works
 Sainte Rita: Patronne des causes désespérées (nouvelles), Bordeaux, Finitude, 2003.
 Ubiquité (roman), Paris, éd. Viviane Hamy, 2005. Prix des Lycéens Librecourt 2006.
 Le Temps d'une chute, Paris, éd. Viviane Hamy, 2007. Prix du roman d'avril des Espaces culturels E. Leclerc et Télé 7 Jours.
 Terre légère, Paris, éd. Viviane Hamy, 2009.
 La dame à la larme, Paris, éd. Viviane Hamy, 2011.

References

1966 births
French women journalists
French women novelists
Living people
French women short story writers
French people of Polish descent
21st-century French novelists
21st-century French women writers
21st-century French short story writers